This is a list of Communist Party of Canada 2015 federal election candidates by riding and province.

Alberta

British Columbia

Manitoba

Newfoundland & Labrador

Nova Scotia

Ontario

Quebec

References

External links 
Party website

Communist Party Of Canada
2015